The Andy Roddick Foundation is a nonprofit organisation founded by tennis player Andy Roddick in 2000. The organisation aims to provide lower-income students with summer and afterschool programs.

History
The foundation was founded in 2000, when Roddick was 18. At the time, he was the top ranked junior tennis player worldwide. In 2012, the Andy Roddick Foundation moved to Austin, TX.

References

"Andy Roddick and Lexus Clinch Perfect Match With Multi-Year Partnership", PRNewsWire, June 17, 2005. Retrieved December 12, 2005.
"Vitalspring Technologies announces official endorsement of Andy Roddick Foundation", February 7, 2005. Retrieved December 12, 2005.
"Andy Roddick Foundation Honored", ATP Insider, December 2, 2005. Retrieved December 12, 2005.

External links

Guidestar Page
"Elton John to star at Andy Roddick Charity Benefit", PRNewsWire, January 25, 2005. Retrieved December 12, 2005.
"USA Tennis Florida joins stars to celebrate Andy Roddick Charity Weekend", USA Tennis Florida, December 20, 2004. Retrieved December 12, 2005.

Children's charities based in the United States
Educational charities based in the United States
Organizations established in 2001